I-Mei Foods is a Taiwanese food company founded in 1934. It is a well-known consumer brand in Taiwan and a major milk processor.

History

I-Mei was founded as a traditional Taiwanese confectionary specializing in pineapple cakes and mung bean cakes. After World War II, I-Mei expanded into the dairy industry. In the mid-1980s, it began supplying buns and dairy products to fast food chains like McDonald's, Burger King, KFC and MOS Burger. 

In May 2019, Costco Taiwan pulled I-Mei brand fresh milk from the shelves after a few consumers on social media questioned the freshness of the milk. Milk products were returned to shelves after testing by the Health Department of Taoyuan City indicated that there was nothing off with the products.

In 2019, I-Mei celebrated its 85th birthday.

Subsidiaries 
 I-Mei Macrobiotics
 I-Mei Biomedicine

I-Mei Gourmet Supplier
I-Mei Gourmet Supplier operates food courts in Taiwan. They operate three food courts in Taoyuan International Airport. As of 2019, Luis Ko is the Chairman of I-Mei Gourmet Supplier.

See also
 List of companies of Taiwan

References

Taiwanese brands
Manufacturing companies based in Taipei
Food and drink companies established in 1934
Dairy products companies
1934 establishments in Taiwan